Solonaima bifurca is a species of leafhopper in the family, Cixiidae, first described by Hannelore Hoch in 1988.

The species is known only from Lamington National Park, Queensland.

References

Cixiidae
Taxa described in 1988